Viedma is the capital of Río Negro province, Argentina.

Viedma may also refer to:

Viedma Department, a part of Chubut province, Argentina
Geographic features
Viedma Lake, a lake in southern Patagonia
Viedma Glacier, a large glacier in southern Patagonia
Viedma (volcano), a subglacial volcano in southern Patagonia
People
Juan Viedma (footballer), a retired Spanish-Dutch footballer
Juan Viedma (athlete), a paralympic athlete from Spain

See also 
Biedma (disambiguation)